Yeh Tera Ghar Yeh Mera Ghar is an Indian television series which premiered on 17 October 2011 on STAR One. The series is produced by Endemol India and stars Prashant Chawla and Neha Mehta.

Plot
This serial is about Neha Mehta's character who tries to unite three brothers with help of their father who gives false news of his death to his sons. He leaves property of 20 crores in his will and lays some conditions for his sons to acquire the property, hoping that in the process they will unite. But their bitterness continues and suddenly it is revealed to them that their father is alive and it was a setup. The three blame Neha Mehta of fooling his father and playing this game. How in this all confusion and drama she will fall in love with Prashant Chawla is the story of the serial.

References

Star One (Indian TV channel) original programming
Indian drama television series
2011 Indian television series debuts
2011 Indian television series endings